La Tuque Water Aerodrome  is located  north of La Tuque, Quebec, Canada.

Geography 
La Tuque Water Aerodrome is located at the entrance to the great bay at the mouth of Bostonnais River which flows into the Saint-Maurice River, just north of the city of La Tuque. Thus, the aerodrome is located on the large reservoir created by La Tuque dam. The aerodrome is located near the municipal campground of La Tuque and close (west side) to the Canadian National Railway and the Street Bostonnais.

See also
 La Tuque Airport

References

Registered aerodromes in Mauricie
La Tuque, Quebec
Seaplane bases in Quebec